Cyrtodactylus halmahericus  is a species of gecko that is endemic to Halmahera in Indonesia.

References 

Cyrtodactylus
Reptiles described in 1929